Marc Rosset defend his title, winning in the final 6–4, 6–3 against Patrik Kühnen.

Seeds

Draw

Finals

Top half

Bottom half

References

External links
 Draw

Kremlin Cup
Kremlin Cup